The men's individual road race was an event at the 1980 Summer Olympics in Moscow. 115 cyclists from 32 nations took part. The maximum number of cyclists per nation was four. The event was won by Sergei Sukhoruchenkov of the Soviet Union, the nation's second victory (after 1960; tying France for second-most behind Italy) in the men's individual road race. His teammate Yuri Barinov took bronze. Czesław Lang's silver put Poland on the podium in the event for the second straight Games.

Background

This was the 11th appearance of the event, previously held in 1896 and then at every Summer Olympics since 1936. It replaced the individual time trial event that had been held from 1912 to 1932 (and which would be reintroduced alongside the road race in 1996). The traditional western powers (Italy, France, Belgium, Sweden) in the sport participated in the Moscow Games amid the American-led boycott. In previous years, the boycott would have had little effect on the competition, but in the late 1970s, the United States had its first international cycling star: Greg LeMond (who would turn professional in 1981 and never compete in the Olympics) who would have been the favorite. Instead, host-nation cyclist Sergei Sukhoruchenkov was the pick to win. Gilbert Glaus of Switzerland (1978) and Gianni Giacomini (1979) had won world championships and were also significant contenders. 

Libya and Zimbabwe each made their debut in the men's individual road race. Great Britain made its 11th appearance in the event, the only nation to have competed in each appearance to date.

Competition format and course

The mass-start race was on a 189 kilometre course at the Krylatskoye Sports Complex in Moscow.

Schedule

All times are Moscow Time (UTC+3)

Results

Sukhoruchenkov broke away on lap 3, with a chase group including Glaus and Giacomini catching him on lap 5. Sukhoruchenkov broke away from that pack with 32 kilometres to go, riding by himself the rest of the way to the largest margin of victory in the event since 1896.

References

External links
 Official Report

Road cycling at the 1980 Summer Olympics
Cycling at the Summer Olympics – Men's road race